Jubba Airways is a Somali airline. It operates domestic passenger and cargo flights within Somalia, as well as to destinations in the Middle East.

History
The carrier was founded in 1998 by one Calgary-based Somali entrepreneur, Said Nur Qailie. Previously headquartered at the Aden Adde International Airport in Mogadishu, Somalia, it is now based in Nairobi, Kenya, with additional branches in various other areas.

In May 1998, a month after the company had been established, the airline embarked on its first voyage. This represented the first direct flight from Sharjah to Mogadishu since the state-owned Somali Airlines discontinued operations in 1991.

As of 2009, Jubba Airways was registered in Nairobi, Kenya. It also has branches in Somalia, Somaliland, Djibouti, Saudi Arabia, the United Arab Emirates and Uganda. The airline largely fills the niche vacated by the defunct Somali Airlines and operates domestic passenger and cargo services. It serves destinations in Somalia including Mogadishu, Bosaso and Galkayo. Flights to Djibouti, Somaliland, the UAE (Dubai), and for Hajj pilgrims to Jeddah are also important routes for the airline. In addition, the airline offers cargo flights. Jubba Airways maintains its own aircraft, serviced by engineers that are a part of a team of 300 trained employees.

In February 2015, Jubba Airways merged with Daallo Airlines to form the new holding company African Airways Alliance. Both airlines continue to operate under separate brands.

Destinations
As of February 2021, Jubba Airways serves the following scheduled destinations:

Fleet

Current fleet
The Jubba Airways fleet consists of the following aircraft (as of July 2022):

Former fleet
The airline previously operated the following aircraft:

2 Airbus A320-200
1 Airbus A321-100
1 Airbus A321-200
2 Boeing 737-200
1 Boeing 737-300
1 Boeing 737-400
1 Fokker 50

Accidents and incidents

See also
Daallo Airlines

References

Bibliography
 The Atlantic, Why Does A Country With Few Roads Have a Growing Airline Industry?, 14 July 2013

External links

 

 
Airlines of Somalia
Airlines of Kenya
Airlines established in 1998
1998 establishments in Somalia
Companies based in Nairobi